Kura or Kowra in Iran may refer to:
 Kura, Bushehr
 Kura, Fars